Esma Nur Çakmak (borm 2004) is a Turkeish armwrestler competimg in the 60 kg category.

Private life 
Esma Nur Çakmak was born to Arif and Satı Çakmak in Ankara, Turkey in 2004. She has three siblings.<ref name="s1"/

Sports career 
Aspiring her father, a former sport wrestler, Çakmak initially started with boxing. She then settled on performing armwrestling in January 2020.

In August 2021, she won the Turkish Championship in the Senior 60 kg category. She is coached by Hüseyin Tuncel.

She won two gold nedals in the 60 kg Junior 18 category at the 2021 World Championship held in Bucharest, Romania.

She became again champion on both arms of the 60 kg Junior 18 category, and she captured the gold medal on the right hand of the Senior 60 kg category at the 2022 World Championship in Antalya, Turkey.

International individual achievements

References 

2004 births
Living people
Sportspeople from Ankara
Female arm wrestlers
Turkish arm wrestlers
Turkish sportswomen